Kalinke may refer to:

Places
 Kalinke, Wisconsin, unincorporated community in Easton, Marathon County, Wisconsin, United States

People with the surname
 Ernst W. Kalinke (1918–1992), German cinematographer
 Margot Kalinke (1909–1981), German politician
 Mario Kalinke (born 1974), German weightlifter
 Peter Kalinke (born 1936), East German footballer